Carriewerloo Station is a pastoral lease that operates as a sheep station in South Australia.

The property was established at some time prior to 1863 when it was owned by James Loudon. In 1865, the property was sold at auction.

George Charles Hawker acquired the station in 1869 and spent much time and money in improving it.

The Hawker brothers put Carriewerloo on the market in 1906 along with Parallana, Kolendoa and Moonaree Stations. It was stocked with 33,000 Bungaree bred sheep.

Scenes from the film The Sundowners were filmed at the property in 1959 and 1960.

In 2007 the property was owned by the Michael family.

The land occupying the extent of the Carriewerloo pastoral lease was gazetted by the Government of South Australia as a locality in April 2013 under the name Carriewerloo.

The Aurora Solar Thermal Power Project is proposed to be constructed from 2018 and producing 495 GWh of electricity annually from 2020.

See also
List of ranches and stations

References

Pastoral leases in South Australia
Stations (Australian agriculture)
Far North (South Australia)